D Stevens (born in Compton, California) is an American broadcast journalist, photojournalist, photographer and filmmaker.

Career
In early 1970, as public affairs director KPFK-FM, Stevens won a Golden Mike Award for exposing conditions at California's Soledad State Prison and the cause of the "Soledad Brothers" including George Jackson.

Stevens later became a photojournalist for Newsweek International in London, covering troubles in Northern Ireland and Uganda. His work has appeared in many international magazines and books including the Smithsonian Institution Traveling Exhibition Service (SITES) and book Songs of My People (published by Time/Warner-Little Brown).

Stevens returned to the United States in the late 1980s to become a commercial photographer in New York City. He later moved to Los Angeles as a freelance photographer for Time magazine and became a member of the Camera Guild (Local 600) working on films including Boyz n the Hood, Menace II Society and What's Love Got to Do With It. He was commissioned to create film posters for Hollywood. Stevens won Best Drama Award for his Love and Basketball poster.

Stevens directed and wrote an independent film entitled The Pet.

External links
 

American photojournalists
American cinematographers
Living people
Year of birth missing (living people)